The Old Spaghetti Factory is an Italian-American-style chain restaurant in the United States and Canada.  The U.S. restaurants are owned by OSF International, based in Portland, Oregon, while the Canadian restaurants are owned by The Old Spaghetti Factory Canada Ltd. In 2003, the U.S. company alone had 45 restaurants, in 14 states and Japan, and sales of $105 million. The U.S. firm also operated an Old Spaghetti Factory in Hamburg, Germany, from 1983 to 1993, but that was its only European location.

History

The chain was founded in Portland, Oregon, on January 10, 1969, by Guss Dussin. OSF International is the corporate name of the original, Portland-based company, which had 4,200 employees as of January 1994, in the U.S. and Japan. The Canadian locations are owned by a separate company, the Old Spaghetti Factory Canada Ltd., based in Vancouver.

In 1983, the U.S. company opened an Old Spaghetti Factory in Hamburg, Germany, which was its 20th location. The Hamburg restaurant was closed 10 years later, having been the chain's only European branch. The company cited high labor costs in Germany as the reason this location was not profitable. The U.S. company had $72 million in sales in 1993, and an estimated $90 million in 1998. After the Spokane, Washington location opened in 1974, a 1996 review by The Spokesman-Review called OSF "one of Spokane's most popular restaurants" and "truly an institution" in the city.

An Old Spaghetti Factory restaurant opened in Sydney, Australia in 1973, in the historic district of The Rocks; it was situated in the Metcalfe Bond Stores, which had been converted to offices, galleries, shops and restaurants. It seems to have been an instant success and was even visited by international celebrities (for instance The Rolling Stones band were photographed in the tram in the restaurant in 1973). By the second half of 1988 the establishment was being touted as a venue for "family fun".

By 2003, the U.S. company had 45 restaurants, in 14 states and Japan, and its sales in 2003 totalled $105 million. It had 3,500 employees at that time. In a 2004 article, The Oregonian newspaper wrote that, "The key to the Old Spaghetti Factory's success has always been full-service meals at fast-food prices, served in large restaurants with intimate spaces created by Tiffany lamps, refurbished trolley cars and lots of gleaming brass." However, the article reported that the chain had recently recorded its first-ever same-store decline in sales as increasingly diet-conscious Americans were cutting back generally on their pasta intake. In response to that trend, OSF began adding some low-carb options to its menu, but was not planning major changes.

Decor and locations

Many of the chain's restaurants are located inside renovated warehouses, train stations, and historic locations. The restaurant decor traditionally features antiques, including chandeliers, brass headboards and footboards as bench backs for booths. Each restaurant's most prominent feature is a streetcar in the middle of the restaurant with seating inside.

The U.S. restaurants are owned by OSF International, based in Portland, Oregon, while the Canadian restaurants are owned by The Old Spaghetti Factory Canada Ltd. The Canadian chain has 15 Old Spaghetti Factories in British Columbia, Alberta, Manitoba, Ontario and Saskatchewan.

The number of U.S. restaurants has fluctuated over the years. As of 1993, the U.S. chain had 30 restaurants in the United States and nine in Japan. In 2003, the U.S. company alone had 45 restaurants, in 14 states and Japan. The number of U.S. locations currently stands at 43, in Arizona, California, Colorado, Hawaii, Indiana, Kentucky, Minnesota, Missouri, Ohio, Oregon, Tennessee, Utah and Washington. The Old Spaghetti Factory (OSF) Japan locations were in Nagoya (closed 2013), Kobe and Kawagoe, Saitama (closed 2009). The downtown Seattle location, which opened in 1970 and was the second in the chain's history, was closed in December 2016, due to the sale of the building.

See also
Spaghetti Warehouse
List of Canadian restaurant chains
 List of Italian restaurants

References

External links

 The Old Spaghetti Factory official American website
 The Old Spaghetti Factory official Canadian website
 The Old Spaghetti Factory official Japanese website

Restaurant chains in the United States
1969 establishments in Oregon
Restaurants established in 1969
Restaurant chains in Canada
Restaurants in Japan
Restaurants in Portland, Oregon
American companies established in 1969
Italian-American culture in Oregon
Italian restaurants in the United States